The BA-30 was a Soviet half-track armored car developed in 1937. Only a small number were built.

Developments

Developed at the NATI Institute, it was hoped that the BA-30 would be an improvement on the off-road performance of the previous BA series and was based on the chassis of the NATI-3 half-tracked transporter, whereas its armored hull was fully welded like the BA-20.

The tracks on the BA-30 used 4 small and two large wheels, along with one return roller which was also incorporated on the NATI-3 and GAZ-60. When used in snowy environments two skis could be added to the front wheels. The BA-30 was noted for having good performance over varying terrains.

It was fitted with a 71-TK-1 radio with its antenna on the hull, armed with a 7.62 DT machine gun, while the vehicle needed manning by a crew of three.

Unapproved
Only a few BA-30s were built and tested, with some taking part in the Winter War of 1939 between the Soviet Union and Finland. However this armored car was not approved for mass production as it was felt to be too heavy compared to other lightly armored cars.

References

External links
 Bronetehnika.info

World War II armoured cars
World War II armoured fighting vehicles of the Soviet Union
Half-tracks of the interwar period
Military vehicles introduced in the 1930s